This is a summary of 1992 in music in the United Kingdom, including the official charts from that year.

Summary
1992 was a bleak time for the UK Singles Chart, with sales at a very low level. Due to several long chart runs, only 12 singles topped the chart this year (not counting the Queen single, which was a holdover from Christmas 1991), the lowest number since 1962, which also saw 12. In addition, none of them only lasted a week – all lasted at least two, the first time this had happened since 1971.

In the album charts Simply Red had continued success with Stars which would prove to be the second best selling album of the 90's and the best of 91 and 92. Although none of its singles reached no.1, title track Stars peaked at no.8 with all others making the top 40.

Shakespears Sister's hit "Stay" was the longest chart topper of 1992, holding onto the No 1 slot for 8 weeks.

The year saw the start of the ABBA revival, though, with Erasure grabbing the top spot for five weeks in June with their Abba-esque EP, which featured covers of ABBA songs. This was followed by ABBA tribute band Björn Again releasing Erasure-ish in October, which featured covers of Erasure songs. This reached number 25. ABBA's ABBA Gold: Greatest Hits album reached No. 1 for a week in September.

September also saw the Shamen attract controversy with the rave song "Ebeneezer Goode", which, though apparently a song about a fictional character, contained many jokey allusions to the drug Ecstasy, including the chorus "Eezer Goode, Eezer Goode, he's Ebeneezer Goode" (which sounded like "E's are good, E's are good", 'E' being a slang term for Ecstasy). The controversy ensured the song reached number 1 and stayed there for four weeks.

The biggest selling single of the year, and also the only one to sell over a million, was Whitney Houston's cover of "I Will Always Love You", taken from the film The Bodyguard. Originally charting in November, the song hit number 1 later that month, and stayed there until February next year.

The Wedding Present equalled the all-time record of Elvis Presley for most UK Top 30 hits in a year (12), by releasing limited edition, 10,000-copies-only 7" singles every month from January to December. Out of this they achieved their first (and only) ever top ten single, "Come Play With Me" in May of that year.

In the field of classical music, British composer John Palmer won the City of Lucerne Cultural Prize for Music.  New classical works by British composers included the Flute Concerto by William Mathias and the String Quartet No. 1 by Mathias's former pupil John Pickard.

Events
 12 February - The KLF perform a thrash metal version of "3am Eternal" with Extreme Noise Terror at the Brit Awards, the performance is rounded off with Bill Drummond firing blanks into the audience before Scott Piering announcing that "The KLF have now left the music business".  And at the aftershow party, the band dump a dead sheep outside.  The band then announce their retirement, deleting their back catalogue, and their Brit award statue was later found buried in a field near Stonehenge.
 20 April – The Freddie Mercury Tribute Concert takes place at Wembley Stadium in London, England. All proceeds go to AIDS research.
 24 April – David Bowie marries fashion model Iman.
 18 May - Shut Up and Dance release their single "Raving I'm Raving" but only as a limited edition single, as the single samples "Walking In Memphis" by Marc Cohn - who threatened a lawsuit after the duo had not sought permission to use the sample.  A compromise is reached, with the duo agreeing to only release it as a limited single, donate all the royalties to charity and to have the single deleted after one week.  The controversy saw the single chart at #2, before falling to No.15 the following week before leaving the chart completely.
 8 August - Morrissey is pelted with coins and missiles after performing at the Madstock Festival, whilst draped in a Union Jack flag and singing "National Front Disco" in front of Madness fans.
 30 October - George Michael files a lawsuit against his label Sony, declaring that they had failed to promote his "Listen Without Prejudice Vol. 1" album, and for what he perceived as "professional slavery" - stating that his label left him with "no artistic control".  He would lose his case in June 1994. George would later state that he regretted suing his label.
 22 November - Factory Records is declared bankrupt, and their catalogue is sold to London Records
 3 December - Bill Wyman announces he is quitting The Rolling Stones.

Charts

Number-one singles

Number-one albums

Year-end charts

Best-selling singles

Best-selling albums

Notes:

Music awards

Brit Awards
The 1992 Brit Awards winners were:

Best British producer: Trevor Horn
Best international solo artist: Prince
Best soundtrack: The Commitments
British album: Seal: Seal
British newcomer: Beverley Craven
British female solo artist – Lisa Stansfield
British group: Simply Red
British male solo artist: Seal
British single: Queen – "These Are the Days of Our Lives"
British video: Seal – "Killer"
International newcomer: P.M. Dawn
International group: R.E.M.
Outstanding contribution: Freddie Mercury

Mercury Music Prize
The 1992 Mercury Music Prize was awarded to Primal Scream – Screamadelica.

Classical music
Alun Hoddinott – Symphony No.9 "Vision of Eternity"
James MacMillan – Veni, Veni, Emmanuel (concerto for percussion and orchestra)
William Mathias – Flute Concerto
David Sawer – Byrnan Wood

Opera
Jonathan Harvey – Inquest of Love.

Film and incidental music
Michael Nyman – The Piano directed by Jane Campion.

Births
10 February – Misha B, singer-songwriter
26 April – Danielle Hope, singer and actress
19 May – Sam Smith, singer-songwriter 
4 July – Nick Hissom, singer
8 July – Benjamin Grosvenor, pianist
2 August – Charli XCX, singer-songwriter
4 August – S-X, producer and singer-songwriter
16 September –Jessica Plummer, actress and singer
5 October – Alex Prior, conductor and composer
22 October
21 Savage, London-born American hip-hop artist
Carrie Hope Fletcher, singer
21 November – Conor Maynard, singer

Deaths
8 February – Denny Wright, guitarist and songwriter, 67 (bladder cancer)
29 April – Stephen Oliver, opera composer, 42 (AIDS-related)
20 June – Sir Charles Groves, conductor, 77
5 July – Georgia Brown, singer and actress, the original Nancy in Oliver!, 58 (surgical complications)
29 July – William Mathias, composer, 57
3 August – Don Lang, trombonist and singer, 67 (cancer)
19 September – Sir Geraint Evans, operatic baritone, 70
7 October – Harold Truscott, pianist, composer, broadcaster and music writer, 78
7 November – Henri Temianka, virtuoso violinist, conductor, author and music educator, 85
29 November – Paul Ryan, singer, songwriter and record producer, 44 (cancer)
22 December – Harry Bluestone, violinist, 85
date unknown
Paul Hammond, drummer of Atomic Rooster (accidental drug overdose)
Malcolm MacDonald, composer

See also
 1992 in British radio
 1992 in British television
 1992 in the United Kingdom
 List of British films of 1992

References

External links
BBC Radio 1's Chart Show
The Official Charts Company

 
British music
Music
British music by year
20th century in music